Kao Meng-ting (born 20 October 1954) is a Taiwanese politician.

Education and early career
Kao graduated from Feng Chia University and National Taiwan University. He taught at Feng Chia University and was a member of New Yunlin Radio Station board of directors.

Political career
Kao won a seat in the third National Assembly as a member of Green Party Taiwan, but left the party in 1997. He was campaign manager and spokesman for independent candidate Chang Jung-wei in the 1999 Yunlin County Magistracy by-election. Kao himself was elected to the Legislative Yuan in 2001 as a representative of Yunlin County. At the start of his term in February 2002, Kao protested the leadership selection process in various legislative committees, positions that were easier to acquire for politicians that were in formal political parties. By March, Kao had not joined any legislative caucus. He considered membership in the Taiwan Solidarity Union, but never joined the party. In July, Kao advocated for the formation of an independent caucus. Such a body was established in August, and Kao was named its spokesman. In January 2003, he joined the Democratic Progressive Party. The next year, Kao accused Wang Jin-pyng of helping Chang Jung-wei secure a retrial on bribery charges dating to 1994. Kao, representing the Democratic Progressive Party, finished second in the Douliu mayoral by-election of 2008.

References

1954 births
Living people
Yunlin County Members of the Legislative Yuan
Democratic Progressive Party Members of the Legislative Yuan
Members of the 5th Legislative Yuan
National Taiwan University alumni
Feng Chia University alumni